The men's kumite +80 kilograms competition at the 2006 Asian Games in Qatar SC Indoor Hall, Doha, Qatar was held on 13 December 2006 at the Qatar SC Indoor Hall.

A total of ten competitors from ten different countries competed in this event, limited to fighters whose body weight was more than 80 kilograms. 

Khalid Khalidov of Kazakhstan won the gold medal, he beat Jaber Al-Hammad from Kuwait in the final, Amer Abu Afifeh of Jordan and Umar Syarief of Indonesia won the bronze medal.

Schedule
All times are Arabia Standard Time (UTC+03:00)

Results
Legend
K — Won by kiken (8–0)

Repechage

References
Results

External links
Official website

Men's kumite 81 kg